Colin John McNair (born 20 March 1969) is a Scottish former footballer who played for Falkirk, Motherwell and Dumbarton.

McNair had a 25-year struggle with drug addiction, that led him to lose his career, home and spend time in prison. He later volunteered with Hamilton Academical to help people in similar situations.

References

1969 births
Footballers from Glasgow
Scottish footballers
Dumbarton F.C. players
Falkirk F.C. players
Motherwell F.C. players
Scottish Football League players
Living people
Association football defenders